The Swift Creek Rail Bridge was a granite and iron truss bridge over Swift Creek in Virginia. The Tidewater and Western Railroad included a bridge over Swift Creek that had been built by an earlier railroad company, the Clover Hill Railroad. The bridge was used during the whole time the four railroad companies operated rails over the bridge. The metal on the bridge was sold as part of foreclosure of the final company in 1917.

Geography and settings
The Swift Creek Rail Bridge in Chesterfield County crossed Swift Creek, one of the two major creeks in the County.  The Bridge crossed the creek, east of Carver Heights Drive, Chester, past a landfill and behind a housing complex west of Bright Hope Road, which is near Beach Road.  The creek is narrow, because this point is west, upstream, of the fall line and the creek is not tidal here.

Architecture

The remains of the bridge are granite abutments that are twenty feet wide indicating that it was a Truss Bridge.  The bridge was one thirty foot span. The abutments were made of granite that was mined using star drills as shown by the drill holes.  The Petersburg granite is readily available in the area.

History
The Swift Creek Rail Bridge was owned by four railroads.

Clover Hill Railroad
The bridge was constructed for the Clover Hill Railroad and Mining Company to get coal trains over Swift Creek in 1841.  The tracks were standard gauge at that time. The State of Virginia declared this bridge sound in 1878.

Brighthope Railway
The Brighthope Railway bought the Clover Hill in bankruptcy and became the new owners of the bridge in 1877.  The new owners increased passenger travel. In, 1881, the Brighthope owners converted the gauge to narrow gauge.

Farmville and Powhatan Railroad
The Farmville and Powhatan Railroad became the new owners in 1884.  The Farmville and Powhatan allowed a telegraph to be added to the rails, which would have had a powered telegraph line across the bridge.

Tidewater and Western Railroad
The Tidewater and Western Railroad bought the bankrupt Farmville and Powhatan in 1905 and went bankrupt themselves in 1917.  Creditors sold the rails and other assets to the World War One Effort in France.  Only the granite abutments remain today. Another bridge takes Beach Road across Swift Creek. A residential road named Bright Hope is nearby.

See also

References

Railway services discontinued in 1917
Rail freight transportation in the United States
Defunct Virginia railroads
Former railway bridges in the United States
Iron bridges in the United States
Truss bridges in the United States
Railroad bridges in Virginia
Buildings and structures in Chesterfield County, Virginia